Henry-Bonaventure Monnier (7 June 1799 in Paris – 3 January 1877) was a French playwright, caricaturist and actor.

Life 
After studying at the Lycée Bonaparte, he frequented the workshops of Anne-Louis Girodet-Trioson and Antoine-Jean Gros. He positioned himself in London in 1822 and returned to France 5 years later. His meetings with Alexandre Dumas, Théophile Gautier, Stendhal, Eugène Sue, Prosper Mérimée, Eugène Scribe, Eugène Delacroix, Louis Boulanger and Honoré de Balzac opened doors to him.

Between 1827 and 1832, he produced several albums of lithographs, satirising the mores and physiognomies of his contemporaries and of the "grisettes" (or louche young men) in his office.  He created the character Monsieur Prudhomme, of whom Balzac said was the "illustration of the type of the Parisian middle-class" and who inspired the poem of that title in Paul Verlaine's Poèmes saturniens.

On 21 May 1834, Monnier married Caroline Péguchet (known as Caroline Linsel, an actress at the Théâtre de la Monnaie) in Brussels.

From the 1850s onwards, he essentially devoted himself to writing and theatre.

He was the author of the famous phrase - On devrait construire les villes à la campagne, l’air y est tellement plus pur ! - that is usually attributed to Alphonse Allais.

In 1931 Sacha Guitry created a play freely inspired by Monnier's life, entitled Monsieur Prudhomme a-t-il vécu ?.

Principal works

Collections of drawings and caricatures 
 Scènes populaires dessinées à la plume, 2 vol. (1830)
 Physiologie du bourgeois (1841)
 Scènes de la ville et de la campagne (1841)
 Les Bourgeois de Paris, scènes comiques (1854)
 Mémoires de Monsieur Joseph Prudhomme, 2 vol. (1857)
 Les Petites Gens (1857)
 Scènes parisiennes (1857)
 Galerie d’originaux (1858)
 Les Bas-fonds de la société (1862)

Theatre 
 Les Mendiants (1829)
 La Famille improvisée (1831)
 Un enfant du peuple (1846)
 La Chasse au succès (1849)
 Les Compatriotes (1849)
 Grandeur et décadence de M. Joseph Prudhomme (1852)
 Le Roman chez la portière (1855)
 Les Métamorphoses de Chamoiseau (1856)
 Peintres et bourgeois (1855)
 Comédies bourgeoises (1858)
 Cendrillon ou la Pantoufle merveilleuse (1879)

Bibliography 

 Jules Champfleury, Henry Monnier Sa vie Son œuvre, E Dentu éditeur, Paris 1879
 ROLLET (Cyrille), Henry Monnier histoire d'un pitre ? quelques copeaux biographiques, mémoire de M2 histoire, sous la direction de Christophe Charle, Université Paris 1, 2008.
 ROLLET (Cyrille), Figurez-vous Henry Monnier..., mémoire de M2 histoire de l'art, sous la direction de Ségolène Le Men, Université Paris 10, 2006.
 Jane Roberts Fine Arts, Paris, Henry Monnier 1799-1877, A Private Collection, exhibition catalogue, 2 volumes, November–December 2013

Notes

External links 
 Une maison du Marais (1831).
 La Manie des albums (1832).
 Henry Monnier Fans & Contributors
 http://www.janerobertsfinearts.com/publications-jane-roberts-fine-arts.html

Writers from Paris
1799 births
1877 deaths
French illustrators
French caricaturists
19th-century French dramatists and playwrights
French male stage actors
19th-century French male actors
Pupils of Antoine-Jean Gros